"American Dreams" is a single by American rock band Papa Roach, from their studio album Crooked Teeth. It peaked at number three on the Billboard Mainstream Rock Songs chart in 2017.

Background
The song was released as a single on April 21, 2017. A lyric video was released a week later, on April 28, featuring a static-filled television set that flashes images of war and the American flag alongside the song's lyrics. The band released a video of a live acoustic performance of the song in July 2017. In August 2017, the band released a music video for the song, consisting of the band interviewing Americans about their thoughts about the hardships of achieving the "American Dream", interviewing people in a school, barbershop, a boxing gym, and tattoo parlor.

Composition and themes
The band teamed up with modern music producers Nicholas Furlong and Colin Brittain to create a sound for the song that melded the band's nu metal sound from their first major record label release Infest, with more modern sounding music. The song starts with a simple guitar chord being played, leading to a heavier, wall of sound of guitar by Jerry Horton and vocals by band frontman Jacoby Shaddix. Shaddix delivers forceful and rhythmic aggressive vocals in the verses, leading up to a large, soaring melodic chorus. Lyrically, the song explores sentiments of doubt and detriment in the concept of "The American Dream", with the chorus containing the lines "American lies / We're trying to see through the smoke in our eyes / So give me the truth / Don't tell me your lies / Cause it's harder to breathe / When you're buried alive by American Dreams." The lyrics were inspired by Shaddix's resentment of current state of American politics, notably the lowbrow arguments of the 2016 Presidential Debates.

Reception
The song received a mixed reception from critics. Loudwire ranked it as the 19th best hard rock song of 2017. Cryptic Rock praised the song for being "quasi-political" and asking some "eerily pivotal questions", concluding that it was "an interesting direction for the band, it is a truly catchy, upbeat rocker that tackles some weighty subject matter." Conversely, "Metal Sucks" strongly criticized the song's vocals, calling it "terrible".

Personnel
 Jacoby Shaddix – lead vocals
 Jerry Horton – guitar
 Tobin Esperance – bass
 Tony Palermo – drums

Charts

References

2017 songs
2017 singles
Papa Roach songs
Political songs
Eleven Seven Label Group singles
Songs written by Jacoby Shaddix
Songs written by Nicholas Furlong (musician)
Songs written by Tobin Esperance
Song recordings produced by Colin Brittain